Myra MacPherson (born 1934) is an American author, biographer, and journalist known for writing about politics, the Vietnam War, feminism, and death and dying. Although her work has appeared in many publications, she had a long affiliation with  The Washington Post newspaper. She was hired in 1968 by Post executive editor Ben Bradlee to write for the paper's Style section, and remained with the Post for over two decades until 1991. While with the title, she profiled those involved in Watergate, covered five presidential campaigns, women's rights issues and wrote a series on Vietnam veterans that led to her 1984 book Long Time Passing: Vietnam and the Haunted Generation. It was the first trade book to examine post-traumatic stress disorder (PTSD) and, according to Vietnam expert Arnold R. Isaacs, one of the first to "break the long national silence" about the war and remains one of the most moving and important works on the Vietnam bookshelf." The author Joseph Heller wrote: "MacPherson's book belongs with the best of the works on Vietnam."

Her first book, The Power Lovers: An Intimate Look at Politicians and Their Marriages was an instant best seller when published by Doubleday in 1975. She Came to Live Out Loud: An Inspiring Family Journey through Illness, Loss and Grief was published in 1999 and won health care hospice awards. MacPherson's book, The Scarlet Sisters: Sex, Suffrage and Scandal in the Gilded Age (Hachette, 2014; paperback 2015) exposes Victorian hypocrisy on sex and women through the true story of two feminist sisters who broke all the rules in 1870 and fought for rights still denied women. "MacPherson's enchanting dual biography…the epilogue "hammers home that even [today] men use women's bodies as political bargaining chips." - The Washington Post;  "MacPherson brings these outrageous and inspiring women to brilliant life." - History Book Club selection; "A lively account of the unlikely lives of the 'two most symbiotic and scandalous sisters in American History." The New Yorker.

Her 2006 biography of I.F. Stone, All Governments Lie! The Life and Times of Rebel Journalist I. F. Stone,  won the 2007 Ann M. Sperber Award for media biography, and was a finalist for a 2008 PEN Center USA literary award; it was also named a best book and best biography of the year by the Boston Globe, Rocky Mountain News and BookList.com.

MacPherson has written for The New York Times, numerous national magazines, and for blogs such as Salon, The Huffington Post and the Nieman Watchdog blog on journalism. She has been on the advisory board of the Harvard Nieman I.F. Stone Award. She continues her interest in helping young journalists through the I.F. Stone Award project and the Molly Award, given annually in remembrance of Molly Ivins.

While doing book research MacPherson has been a fellow at Rutgers University, a Ford Foundation fellow in Bellagio, Italy and a recipient of a Fulbright Grant to study in Japan.

In 2016, All Governments Lie: Truth Deception and the Spirit of I. F. Stone, a 2016 documentary featuring today's best investigative reporters was based in part on her Stone book. The documentary premiered at the Toronto International Film Festival; Oliver Stone was the executive producer and journalist Fred Peabody directed the film.

Biography

The granddaughter of a coal miner, MacPherson was raised in a town with under 1,000 inhabitants,. A few years after graduating from college, she interviewed President John F. Kennedy. She credits her editors, Sid Epstein at The Washington Star and later Ben Bradlee at The Washington Post, for ignoring a long-established bias against women covering politics, sports and major news during the sixties. (Still the Star refused to send her to the South to cover the Civil rights movement because it was "too dangerous for a 'girl.'"). And employment discrimination against women affected her early career. After writing for State News, the student daily of Michigan State University, she sought a job at the Detroit Free Press. The executive editor said he was sorry "but we have no openings in the women's section." MacPherson replied: "I wasn't applying for the women's section." Looking aghast, he said "we have NO women in the city room." MacPherson took a job running copy to the printers from the editorial writers, working her way up to by-lined articles that led to a job at the Detroit Times, where she was assigned to the 1960 Indy 500. She was the only woman in the country covering it. She could not interview the racers in gasoline alley and was banned from the sports box. A male colleague quipped: "How much does your editor hate you?"

As for females, she interviewed such disparate women as Helen Keller, Nicaraguan president Violeta Chamorro, and the mother of the serial killer Ted Bundy. She wrote about murderers and slain Civil Rights leader Medgar Evers, covered the State funeral of President Kennedy, Presidential campaigns and specialized in in-depth profiles of politicians, including a martini-drinking Fidel Castro. However, even in 1969 she was banned from the sports box while the Miracle Mets won their smashing victory. When she wrote about the banning, and another women reporter sued, Pulitzer Prize winning New York Times sports columnist, Red Smith, wrote that it was about time such silly rules ended, thus paving the way for the many women active in sports media, including MacPherson's daughter, Leah Siegel, who became a three-time Emmy award-winning ESPN producer. She had practically grown up in the sports box with her sports writer father, Morrie Siegel. Decades before, he had introduced his wife to a host of sports characters and hangers on, including New York restaurateur Toots Shor who told MacPherson at an all-male-except-her dinner, "We're not interested in what you think, you're only here because of Morrie… As far as I am concerned all broads are a piece of raisin cake." The weird phrase meant nothing to her but it was enough to tell Toots off and to exit the restaurant.

MacPherson has two children, Leah, and Mike, who has had a career in politics. Leah Siegel died from breast cancer in July 2010. She continues to campaign for women's rights. She met her second husband, liberal Florida State Senator, Jack Gordon, when she covered the ultimately rejected Equal Rights Amendment for The Washington Post in 1977. Gordon was the only male sponsor.

Bibliography

Selected periodicals

 review of Shrub by Molly Ivins and Louis Dubose

Sound

Books
 on Victoria Woodhull and Tennessee Celeste Claflin

References

Further reading
Booklist, December 15, 1998, Danise Hoover, review of She Came to Live out Loud: An Inspiring Family Journey through Illness, Loss, and Grief, p. 708.

Library Journal, January 1999, Bette-Lee Fox, review of She Came to Live out Loud, p. 131.
Los Angeles Times Book Review, June 10, 1984, Elizabeth Janeway, review of Long Time Passing: Vietnam and the Haunted Generation, pp. 1, 7.
Nation, June 23, 1984, p. 763.
National Review, December 19, 1975, Anne Crutcher, review of The Power Lovers: An Intimate Look at Politics and Marriage, pp. 1489–1490.
New York Times, June 24, 1984, Donald Knox, review of Long Time Passing, p. 9.
New York Times Book Review, November 30, 1975, Jane O'Reilly, review of The Power Lovers, pp. 8, 17

New York Times Book Review, May 9, 1999, Sara Ivry, review of She Came to Live out Loud, p. 27.
Publishers Weekly, January 4, 1999, review of She Came to Live out Loud, p. 81.
Washingtonian, May 1999, p. 50.
Washington Post Book World, August 31, 1975, review of The Power Lovers, p. 1
Washington Post Book World, June 3, 1984, Jack Beatty, review of Long Time Passing, pp. 1, 14.
 review of All Governments Lie
 review of All Governments Lie

External links

Michigan State University alumni
Detroit Free Press people
The Washington Star people
The Washington Post people
American feminist writers
American sportswriters
Date of birth missing (living people)
Place of birth missing (living people)
1930s births
Living people
20th-century American biographers
American women biographers
21st-century American biographers
20th-century American women writers
21st-century American women writers